Russell Gunn (born October 20, 1971 in Chicago) is an American contemporary jazz trumpeter.

He grew up in East St. Louis, Illinois playing trumpet. As a kid his musical interest was hip hop, with LL Cool J being his first music idol. His projects include a large ensemble called Bionic, which released an album called Krunk Jazz, and his smaller group Electrik Butterfly.

Discography
As leader
 1995 - Young Gunn (Muse)		
 1997 - Gunn Fu (HighNote)		
 1998 - Young Gunn Plus (32 Jazz)		
 1999 - Love Requiem (HighNote)		
 1999 - Ethnomusicology, Vol. 1 (Atlantic)		
 2000 - Smokin' Gunn (HighNote)		
 2001 - Ethnomusicology, Vol. 2 (Justin Time)		
 2002 - Blue on the D.L. (HighNote)		
 2003 - Ethnomusicology, Vol. 3 (Justin Time)		
 2003 - Mood Swings (HighNote)		
 2004 - Ethnomusicology, Vol. 4: Live in Atlanta (Justin Time)		
 2006 - Russell Gunn Presents... Bionic: Krunk Jazz (Groid Music 001)		
 2007 - Russell Gunn Plays Miles (HighNote)	
 2008 - Love Stories (HighNote)		
 2010 - Ethnomusicology, Vol. 6: Return of Gunn Fu (Groid Music 002)
 2013 - Russell Gunn & Elektrik Butterfly: Elektrik Funeral (Hot Shoe Music)
 2016 - The Royal Krunk Jazz Orkestra: Le Mystere de Sirius (The Sirius Mystery) (Groid Music 003)
 2018 - The Royal Krunk Jazz Orkestra: Get It How You Live (Ropeadope)
 2019 - The Royal Krunk Jazz Orkestra: Pyramids (Ropeadope)
 2021 - The Royal Krunk Jazz Orkestra: The Sirius Mystery: Opus 4, No. 1 [EP] (Ropeadope)

As sideman and co-leader
 1994 - Oliver Lake: Dedicated to Dolphy (Black Saint)
 1994 - Wynton Marsalis: Blood on the Fields (Columbia)
 1997 - Carlos Garnett: Under Nubian Skies (HighNotee)
 1997 - Buckshot LeFonque: Music Evolution (Columbia)

References

External links
 Russell Gunn's official website
 Biography

1971 births
Musicians from Chicago
People from East St. Louis, Illinois
Living people
American jazz trumpeters
American male trumpeters
Muse Records artists
Atlantic Records artists
HighNote Records artists
21st-century trumpeters
Jazz musicians from Illinois
21st-century American male musicians
American male jazz musicians
Buckshot LeFonque members
Justin Time Records artists
The Soultronics members